The Monga National Park is a  national park located  south west of Sydney, New South Wales, Australia. The closest town nearby is Braidwood.

Monga features outstanding high altitude eucalyptus forest and temperate rainforest. It contains the Corn Trail, a historic bridle-track, built in the 1830s, that has been restored and reopened as a walking track.

In the park you can find many cultural sites of the ancient Aboriginal peoples of Yuin and Walbunja.

The park has an elevation of 686 meters.

Gallery

See also

 Protected areas of New South Wales

References 

National parks of New South Wales
Protected areas established in 2001
2001 establishments in Australia
Southern Tablelands